Events in the year 2002 in Bulgaria.

Incumbents 
 President: Georgi Parvanov
 Prime Minister: Simeon Sakskoburggotski
 Speaker: Ognyan Gerdzhikov

Events 

 14 January – Bulgaria competed at the 2002 Winter Olympics in Salt Lake City, United States, winning one silver and two bronze medals.

References 

 
2000s in Bulgaria
Years of the 21st century in Bulgaria
Bulgaria
Bulgaria